History of Perth can refer to:

History of Perth, Scotland
History of Perth, Western Australia